Peter Nils Andersson (born 2 March 1962 in Stockholm, Sweden) is a retired Swedish ice hockey player who played briefly in the National Hockey League.  Selected in the 1980 NHL Entry Draft by the Washington Capitals, Andersson also played for the Quebec Nordiques.

Career statistics

Regular season and playoffs

International

External links
 

1962 births
Living people
Binghamton Whalers players
Ice hockey players at the 1988 Winter Olympics
Ice hockey players at the 1992 Winter Olympics
IF Björklöven players
EHC Kloten players
Medalists at the 1988 Winter Olympics
Olympic bronze medalists for Sweden
Olympic ice hockey players of Sweden
Olympic medalists in ice hockey
Quebec Nordiques players
Ice hockey people from Stockholm
Swedish expatriate ice hockey players in Canada
Swedish expatriate ice hockey players in the United States
Timrå IK players
Washington Capitals draft picks
Washington Capitals players
Swedish expatriate sportspeople in Switzerland
Expatriate ice hockey players in Switzerland